Eupithecia raniata is a moth in the family Geometridae. It is found in India (West Bengal), Nepal, Myanmar and northern Thailand.

References

Moths described in 1958
raniata
Moths of Asia